Duel with Death (German: Duell mit dem Tod) is a 1949 Austrian war drama film directed by Paul May and starring Rolf von Nauckhoff, Annelies Reinhold, and Fritz Hinz-Fabricius. The film portrays the Austrian resistance to Nazi Germany during the Second World War.

The film's sets were designed by the art director Otto Pischinger.

It premiered at the Locarno Film Festival in July 1949 before going on general release in Austria that December.

Synopsis
A Professor is brought before an Allied military court to explain apparently incriminating evidence against him. This gives him a chance to recount what really happened during the war years.

Cast
 Rolf von Nauckhoff as Dr. Ernst Romberg  
 Annelies Reinhold as Maria Romberg  
 Fritz Hinz-Fabricius as Pfarrer Menhardt  
 Hans Dreßler as Defense lawyer Dr. Hallmann  
 Louis V. Arco as Gerichtsvorsitzender  
 Ernst Waldbrunn as Franz Lang  
 Maria Eis as Frau Lang  
 Erich Auer as Geisler  
 Martin King  as Ziegler  
 Manfred Schuster as Beierle  
 Hannes Schiel as Rainer, Standartenführer der SS  
 Josef Krastel as Kaindl  
 Emmerich Schrenk as Dietz, Sturmführer der SS  
 Otto Schmöle as Präsident des deutschen Feldkriegsgerichts 
 Ulrich Bettac 
 Erich Dörner 
 Heinz Moog

References

Bibliography 
 Fritsche, Maria. Homemade Men in Postwar Austrian Cinema: Nationhood, Genre and Masculinity. Berghahn Books, 2013.

External links 
 

1949 films
1940s war drama films
Austrian war drama films
1940s German-language films
Films directed by Paul May
World War II war crimes trials films
Austrian black-and-white films
1949 drama films
Austrian World War II films
Films about Austrian resistance